William Hooker may refer to:

 William Hooker (musician) (born 1946), American jazz drummer and composer
 William Jackson Hooker (1785–1865), English botanist and botanical illustrator
 William Hooker (botanical illustrator) (1779–1832), British botanical illustrator
 William Dalton Hooker (1816–1840), British physician and botanist
 William Hooker (cricketer) (1796–1867), English cricketer